Hans Jacob Stabel (27 August 1769 – 7 January 1836) was a Norwegian priest and elected official.
 
Hans  Stabel was born at the parsonage where his father was parish pastor in Onsøy at Fredrikstad in  Østfold.   In 1792, he took a job as personnel chaplain in Onsøy. From 1799 he was an assistant pastor at Slidre in Oppland. In 1806, he became pastor in Sør-Aurdal.  He was a vicar in Kristiansand from 1822 to 1825. He served as pastor in Østre Toten from 1825 until he died in 1836.  

In 1814, he was a member of the constitutional assembly to draft and sign the Norwegian Constitution as a representative from Kristians amt, now Oppland. He was made a member of the Royal Order of Vasa by King Karl XIV Johan.

References

Related Reading
Holme, Jørn  (ed.) (2014) De kom fra alle kanter - Eidsvollsmennene og deres hus (Oslo: Cappelen Damm) ..

External links
Grunnlovsjubileet i Norge 2014

1769 births
1836 deaths
People from Fredrikstad
Fathers of the Constitution of Norway
Recipients of the Order of Vasa